Gen Shirane (kanji: 白根 元 Shirane Gen; furigana: しらね げん; May 15, 1924 in Nishinomiya, Japan – 16 January 16, 2005 in Bellport, New York) was a Japanese-American experimental solid-state physicist, known for his investigations using neutron scattering as a probe of solids. He lived most of his life in the USA.

Biography
At the University of Tokyo, Shirane received his BE in engineering physics in 1944 and his DSc in physics in 1947 with a thesis on ferroelectrics. He was from 1948 to 1952 a research associate in physics at the Tokyo Institute of Technology. At Pennsylvania State University he was from 1952 to 1955 a research associate and from 1955 to 1956 an assistant professor of physics. From 1956 to 1957 he was an associate physicist at Brookhaven National Laboratory. At Westinghouse Research Laboratories in Pittsburgh, he was from 1957 to 1958 a research physicist and from 1959 to 1963 an advising physicist. At Brookhaven National Laboratory he was from 1963 to 1968 a physicist and from 1968 to 2005 a senior physicist.

In the late 1960s and early 1970s, Shirane with co-workers confirmed the soft mode theory of P. W. Anderson and W. Cochran and discovered new features of structural phase transitions beyond the soft mode theory.

Shirane was a leading international authority on neutron spectroscopy in solid-state physics, including magnetic materials and high-Tc superconductivity. He trained many younger physicists in neutron scattering and effectively promoted collaborations between Japan and the USA. He was the author or co-author of over 750 scientific publications with nearly 40,000 citations by the year of his death. His h-index was 103.

Awards and honors
 1973 — Oliver E. Buckley Condensed Matter Prize, American Physical Society
 1973 — Warren Award of the American Crystallographic Association
 1989 — Member of the National Academy of Sciences
 1989 — DOE Award for Outstanding Scientific Accomplishment in Solid State Physics
 1991 — Fellow of the American Academy of Arts and Sciences
 2003 — Award for Outstanding Accomplishment, Japanese Society for Neutron Science

Selected publications
 with Franco Jona: ; Dover reprint, 1993
 with Stephen M. Shapiro and John M. Tranquada:

References

External links
  (with list of publications)

1924 births
2005 deaths
People from Nishinomiya
University of Tokyo alumni
Japanese physicists
20th-century American physicists
21st-century American physicists
Members of the United States National Academy of Sciences
Fellows of the American Academy of Arts and Sciences
Fellows of the American Physical Society
Oliver E. Buckley Condensed Matter Prize winners
Japanese emigrants to the United States
American people of Japanese descent